Histopathology (compound of three Greek words:   'tissue',   'suffering', and  -logia 'study of') refers to the microscopic examination of tissue in order to study the manifestations of disease. Specifically, in clinical medicine, histopathology refers to the examination of a biopsy or surgical specimen by a pathologist, after the specimen has been processed and histological sections have been placed onto glass slides. In contrast, cytopathology examines free cells or tissue micro-fragments (as "cell blocks").

Collection of tissues 
Histopathological examination of tissues starts with surgery, biopsy, or autopsy. The tissue is removed from the body or plant, and then, often following expert dissection in the fresh state, placed in a fixative which stabilizes the tissues to prevent decay. The most common fixative is 10% neutral buffered formalin (corresponding to 3.7% w/v formaldehyde in neutral buffered water, such as phosphate buffered saline).

Preparation for histology 

The tissue is then prepared for viewing under a microscope using either chemical fixation or frozen section.

If a large sample is provided e.g. from a surgical procedure then a pathologist looks at the tissue sample and selects the part most likely to yield a useful and accurate diagnosis - this part is removed for examination in a process commonly known as grossing or cut up. Larger samples are cut to correctly situate their anatomical structures in the cassette. Certain specimens (especially biopsies) can undergo agar pre-embedding to assure correct tissue orientation in cassette & then in the block & then on the diagnostic microscopy slide. This is then placed into a plastic cassette for most of the rest of the process.

Chemical fixation

In addition to formalin, other chemical fixatives have been used. But, with the advent of immunohistochemistry (IHC) staining and diagnostic molecular pathology testing on these specimen samples, formalin has become the standard chemical fixative in human diagnostic histopathology. Fixation times for very small specimens are shorter, and standards exist in human diagnostic histopathology.

Processing
Water is removed from the sample in successive stages by the use of increasing concentrations of alcohol. Xylene is used in the last dehydration phase instead of alcohol - this is because the wax used in the next stage is soluble in xylene where it is not in alcohol allowing wax to permeate (infiltrate) the specimen. This process is generally automated and done overnight. The wax infiltrated specimen is then transferred to an individual specimen embedding (usually metal) container. Finally, molten wax is introduced around the specimen in the container and cooled to solidification so as to embed it in the wax block.  This process is needed to provide a properly oriented sample sturdy enough for obtaining a thin microtome section(s) for the slide.

Once the wax embedded block is finished, sections will be cut from it and usually placed to float on a waterbath surface which spreads the section out. This is usually done by hand and is a skilled job (histotechnologist) with the lab personnel making choices about which parts of the specimen microtome wax ribbon to place on slides. A number of slides will usually be prepared from different levels throughout the block. After this the thin section mounted slide is stained and a protective cover slip is mounted on it. For common stains, an automatic process is normally used; but rarely used stains are often done by hand.

Frozen section processing 

An initial evaluation of a suspected lymphoma is to make a "touch prep" wherein a glass slide is lightly pressed against excised lymphoid tissue, and subsequently stained (usually H&E stain) for evaluation under light microscopy.
The second method of histology processing is called frozen section processing. This is a highly technical scientific method performed by a trained histoscientist. In this method, the tissue is frozen and sliced thinly using a microtome mounted in a below-freezing refrigeration device called the cryostat.  The thin frozen sections are mounted on a glass slide, fixed immediately & briefly in liquid fixative, and stained using the similar staining techniques as traditional wax embedded sections.  The advantages of this method is rapid processing time, less equipment requirement, and less need for ventilation in the laboratory.  The disadvantage is the poor quality of the final slide.  It is used in intra-operative pathology for determinations that might help in choosing the next step in surgery during that surgical session (for example, to preliminarily determine clearness of the resection margin of a tumor during surgery).

Staining of processed histology slides 

This can be done to slides processed by the chemical fixation or frozen section slides.  To see the tissue under a microscope, the sections are stained with one or more pigments. The aim of staining is to reveal cellular components; counterstains are used to provide contrast.

The most commonly used stain in histology is a combination of hematoxylin and eosin (often abbreviated H&E). Hematoxylin is used to stain nuclei blue, while eosin stains the cytoplasm and the extracellular connective tissue matrix of most cells pink. There are hundreds of various other techniques which have been used to selectively stain cells. Other compounds used to color tissue sections include safranin, Oil Red O, congo red, silver salts and artificial dyes. Histochemistry refers to the science of using chemical reactions between laboratory chemicals and components within tissue. A commonly performed histochemical technique is the Perls' Prussian blue reaction, used to demonstrate iron deposits in diseases like Hemochromatosis.

Recently, antibodies have been used to stain particular proteins, lipids and carbohydrates. Called immunohistochemistry, this technique has greatly increased the ability to specifically identify categories of cells under a microscope. Other advanced techniques include in situ hybridization to identify specific DNA or RNA molecules. These antibody staining methods often require the use of frozen section histology. These procedures above are also carried out in the laboratory under scrutiny and precision by a trained specialist medical laboratory scientist (a histoscientist). Digital cameras are increasingly used to capture histopathological images.

Interpretation 
The histological slides are examined under a microscope by a pathologist, a medically qualified specialist who has completed a recognised training program. This medical diagnosis is formulated as a pathology report describing the histological findings and the opinion of the pathologist. In the case of cancer, this represents the tissue diagnosis required for most treatment protocols.  In the removal of cancer, the pathologist will indicate whether the surgical margin is cleared, or is involved (residual cancer is left behind).  This is done using either the bread loafing or CCPDMA method of processing. Microscopic visual artifacts can potentially cause misdiagnosis of samples.

Following are examples of general features of suspicious findings that can be appreciated from low to high magnification on histopathology:

Architectural patterns
Major histopathologic architectural patterns include:

Nuclear patterns
Major nuclear patterns include:

In myocardial infarction 

After a myocardial infarction (heart attack), no histopathology is seen the first ~30 minutes. The only possible sign the first 4 hours is waviness of fibres at border. Later, however, a coagulation necrosis is initiated, with edema and hemorrhage. After 12 hours, there can be seen karyopyknosis and hypereosinophilia of myocytes with contraction band necrosis in margins, as well as beginning of neutrophil infiltration. At 1 – 3 days there is continued coagulation necrosis with loss of nuclei and striations and an increased infiltration of neutrophils to interstitium. Until the end of the first week after infarction there is beginning of disintegration of dead muscle fibres, necrosis of neutrophils and beginning of macrophage removal of dead cells at border, which increases the succeeding days. After a week there is also beginning of granulation tissue formation at margins, which matures during the following month, and gets increased collagen deposition and decreased cellularity until the myocardial scarring is fully mature at approximately 2 months after infarction.

See also 
 Anatomical pathology
 Molecular pathology
 Frozen section procedure
 Medical technologist
 Laser capture microdissection
 List of pathologists

References

External links 

Virtual Histology Course - University of Zurich (German, English version in preparation)
Histopathology of the uterine cervix - digital atlas (IARC Screening Group)
Histopathology Virtual Slidebox - University of Iowa

 
Anatomical pathology
Pathology